Hengfeng County is a small county under the administration of Shangrao city, Jiangxi province, China.

History 
Hengfeng county was set up in the 39th year of the Ming Jiajing Reign (1560) with the name Xing'an. Its first mandarin was Chen Qingyun, who assumed office that year.

In the 3rd year of the Republic of China (1914), the name of the county was changed from Xing'an to Hengfeng in order to eliminate ambiguity with the like-named county in Guilin Municipality, Guangxi.

In the 1930s Hengfeng was the centre of the Northeastern Jiangxi Revolutionary Base Area, later NEJX Soviet.

Geography 
The highest mountain is Mopan Mountain with its peak altitude . Cengang River runs across the county. The county's intensity of river grid is 0.2 km/square km.

Administrative divisions
In the present, Hengfeng County has 1 subdistrict, 2 towns and 6 townships.
1 subdistrict
 Xing'an

2 towns
 Cenyang
 Geyuan

6 townships

Climate

Celebrities 
In the last century, the main celebrities are Fang Zhimin and Shao Shiping.

Fang Zhimin 
Fang, born 1900 in Yiyang County, Jiangxi Province, led revolution in Jiangxi with Communism faith and Marxism theory, who had the same prestige with Mao Zedong at that time. Fang and Shao Shiping had successfully launched Yiyang-Hengfeng Uprising and built the Northeast Jiangxi Revolution Base. But unfortunately he was captured by the Kuomintang troops in the Huaiyu Mountains, Yushan County, Jiangxi in his adult age in 1935 and killed in Nanchang in the same year. In prison he wrote is his masterpiece 'Lovely China' and influenced a number of revolutionaries.

Shao Shiping
Shao (1900–1965), also born in Yiyang County, was also reputed for the revolution. After the foundation of People's Republic of China in 1949, he was the initial province stadholder of Jiangxi. With Fang, Shao had successfully launched the Yiyang-Hengfeng Uprising and built the Northeast Jiangxi Revolution Base.

Population 
Until 2005, the population is about 200,000, most of which work in the primary industry.

Transportation 
The transportation is very convenient. No.320 National Road, No.311 Expressway (alias name is Hukun Expressway, or Liwen Expressway), Zhejiang-Jiangxi Railway, Hengnan Railway make the county 2 hours to Nanchang city, 3 to Hanzhou city, 4 to Shanghai city.

Economy 
Currently the local government concentrates on developing economy, mainly by building industry garden and offering good policies. Xin'an Industry Garden lies in the western part which is gradually expanding west to the boundary of its nearby county -Yiyang County.

Sights and Resort

Sights 
Cen Mountain lies in the north of Cenyang Town, which is the place of administration centre. In the mountain there are Cen Mountain Cave Temple and Tiantai Temple, both of which are Buddhist temples. There is a beautiful legend about Cen Mountain Cave. The daughter of the highest administrator of the county got blind caused by illness, and the administrator sought for all kinds of treatments to heal her but none had made sense. The local residents recommended him to use the fountain from the Cen Mountain Cave to wash her eyes. The miracle happened. The girl was able to see the world clearly again. The administrator was so very happy that he decided to build a temple to protect and commemorate the fountain, that is Cen Mountain Cave Temple.

Resort 
Geyuan Town once was the capital of The Northeast Jiangxi Revolution Base where quite a lot of relics remain, such as Red Square, Hospital, Post Office, The school of Workers Peasants & Warriors, and so on.

References

 
Shangrao
County-level divisions of Jiangxi